Indian Creek is a stream in Newton and McDonald counties of southwest Missouri. It is a tributary of the Elk River.

The stream starts at the confluence of North and South Indian creeks just east of Boulder City and flows southwest into McDonald County. It flows past the communities of McNatt and Erie and under U. S. Route 71 and Missouri Route 76 just southeast of Anderson. The stream turns south and flows parallel to Missouri Route 59 past Lanagan to its confluence with the Elk River about midway between Pineville and Noel. At Lanagan, the creek has a mean annual discharge of 231 cubic feet per second.

Indian Creek was named for the fact American Indians had settled near its course.

See also
List of rivers of Missouri

References

Rivers of McDonald County, Missouri
Rivers of Newton County, Missouri
Rivers of Missouri